The Big Premiere is a 1940 Our Gang short comedy film directed by Edward Cahn. It was the 188th Our Gang short (189th episode, 100th talking short, 101st talking episode, and 20th MGM produced episode) that was released.

Plot
The gang unintentionally wreaks havoc at the gala Hollywood premiere of the adventure epic Gun Boats. Chased away by the angry authorities, the undaunted kids decide to stage their own movie premiere—and they even film a movie for the occasion. Unfortunately, the gang's cinematic effort, entitled The Mysteeryus Mystery, is not as entertaining as the efforts by Buckwheat to remove his feet from a block of cement.

Cast

The Gang
 Mickey Gubitosi — Mickey
 Darla Hood — Darla
 George McFarland — Spanky
 Carl Switzer — Alfalfa
 Billie Thomas — Buckwheat
 Shirley Coates — Muggsy
 Darwood Kaye — Waldo

Additional cast
 John Dilson — theater owner
 Eddie Gribbon — police officer
 Ethelreda Leopold — Irma Acacia

Barn extras
Giovanna Gubitosi, James Gubitosi, Larry Harris, Arthur Mackey, Tommy McFarland, Harold Switzer, Clyde Wilson

See also
 Our Gang filmography

References

External links
 
 

1940 films
1940 comedy films
American black-and-white films
Films directed by Edward L. Cahn
Metro-Goldwyn-Mayer short films
Our Gang films
1940 short films
1940s American films
1940s English-language films